Dohak may refer to:
Deyhuk, village also spelled Dohak, capital of Deyhuk District, Iran
Dohak-dong, dong (neighbourhood) of Daegu, South Korea
Mubarak Dohak, Malay royal in Negeri Sembilan

See also
Duhak, village in Bilaspur District, Himachal Pradesh, India